The Ashes series, similar to the cricket series of the same name, is a best-of-three series of test matches between the British and Australian national rugby league football teams. It has been contested 39 times from 1908 until 2003 largely with hosting rights alternating between the two countries. From 1973 Australia won thirteen consecutive Ashes series. The series was set to be revived in 2020, but was cancelled due to the COVID-19 pandemic.

History
Several sports and events adopted cricket's Ashes "concept" and by the beginning of the 20th century it was an "accepted principle" that a series had to have at least three matches to be a true test of which side was the best.

On 27 September 1908, the first touring Australian rugby league side arrived in England, and played their first ever Test against the England side in December in London. Two further Tests were played. The Australians suggested that the series should be called "The Ashes" and the name stuck.

The format used is that three matches are played, with the winning team being decided on the basis of most matches won. If one team has already won two matches the series is already won, however the final game is usually still played. In the 1929–30 Ashes series both the teams won one game and one game was drawn; it was therefore decided to hold a further match to determine the outcome.

The British side has not always been termed Great Britain; in the past the titles "Northern Union XIII", "England" and "The Lions" have also been used. Similarly, from the 1911–12 Kangaroo tour until the 1929–30 tour, Australian touring sides had included New Zealand players so were styled "Australasia", though when playing at home they always played as Australia.

Since 1964 the Harry Sunderland Medal is awarded to the best Australian player in a home Ashes series. Since Great Britain's win in Australia in 1970, the series has been very one sided with Australia having won 13 consecutive ashes, 5 of those (1979, 1982, 1984, 1986 and 2003) being 3–0 series whitewashes while the 1988 series had already been won by Australia in the first two tests before the Lions won a famous third test in Sydney 26–12 for their first test win over Australia since the second test of the 1978 Kangaroo tour, a streak of 15 wins for the Kangaroos.

The performance gap between the two teams became wider during the mid-late 1970s and Great Britain struggled to compete with Australia.  The 1982 Kangaroos became the first side to go through a tour of Great Britain and France undefeated (something never achieved on a Lions tour, though they came close in 1954 losing just 2 games). This earned the team the nickname "The Invincibles". The 1986 Kangaroos repeated this feat and would be known as "The Unbeatables".

The Ashes had not been contested since 2003 when, in 2009 with the prospect of not contesting them until after the 2013 World Cup, Britain's Rugby Football League (RFL) challenged the Australian Rugby League (ARL) to play the round-robin stage match of the Four Nations tournament with the Ashes at stake. The one-off game would be a departure from the usual three-match series, additionally the contest would be between England, rather than Great Britain, and Australia. The ARL initially agreed to the proposal but later, facing hostility from former Ashes players and fans who thought the proposals devalued the Ashes, the two governing bodies decided not to proceed.

In 2016, newly appointed Australian team coach Mal Meninga, who as a player was selected to a record 4 Kangaroo Tours (the last two as captain) and played in a record 6 Ashes series (1982, 1984, 1986, 1990, 1992 and 1994 - playing a record 17 Ashes tests, only missing 1988 through injury), publicly advocated for a return of the Kangaroo Tours which would see The Ashes revived in 2020. The proposed 2020 series was cancelled in June 2020 due to the COVID-19 pandemic. It was suggested that the series may be played in 2022 instead.

Trophy
In 1928, the City Tattersalls Club in Sydney, Australia donated a trophy to be the prize, the "Ashes Cup". 
The Cup's inscription reads:
INTERNATIONAL
RUGBY LEAGUE FOOTBALL
Australia v England
(THE ASHES)
Presented by
CITY TATTERSALLS CLUB
The Cup was first presented in 1928 to The Lions, after they defeated Australia 2–1 in the series. Following the 1933–34 series, in which England retained the Cup for the third time since first being presented with it, the Cup disappeared in the United Kingdom and was not found until October 1945. The trophy had been on display at a function in Ilkley, Yorkshire and afterwards was returned to the manager of the Griffin Hotel, Leeds - where the English Rugby League management met - but this was not made clear to the English authorities and instead in laid overlooked in a box for 12 years. During the period it was missing, Great Britain had won each series and the Cup's disappearance was not widely known. The Australian team first won the Cup in 1950.

In preparation for the Legends of League exhibition at the National Museum of Australia in 2008, marking a Centenary of Rugby League in Australia, the Ashes Cup underwent preservation work.

Results

Summary of Ashes series

Records and statistics

Highest attendance
 Australia – 70,204 at the Sydney Cricket Ground, Sydney, 6 June 1932
 Great Britain – 57,034 at Wembley Stadium, London, 22 October 1994

Lowest attendance
 Australia – 15,944 at the Sydney Football Stadium, Sydney, 9 July 1988
 Great Britain – 2,000 at the Park Royal Ground, London, 12 October 1908

Highest attended Ashes series
 Australia – 179,816 in 1954
 Great Britain – 140,432 in 1994

Lowest attended Ashes series
 Australia – 60,000 in 1910
 Great Britain – 33,000 in 1908–09

Highest score
 Australia def. Great Britain 50–12 at Station Road, Swinton, 9 November 1963
 Great Britain def. Australia 40–17 at Sydney Cricket Ground, Sydney, 19 July 1958

Biggest win
 38 points – Australia def. Great Britain 50–12 at Station Road, Swinton, 9 November 1963
 23 points – Great Britain def. Australia 40–17 at Sydney Cricket Ground, Sydney, 19 July 1958  23 points - Great Britain def. Australia 33–10 at Princes Park, Melbourne, 26 June 1992

Most tries in an Ashes test
 Australia  3 – Reg Gasnier at Station Road, Swinton, 17 October 1959  3 – Reg Gasnier at Wembley Stadium, 16 October 1963  3 – Ken Irvine at Station Road, Swinton, 9 November 1963  3 – Ken Irvine at Sydney Cricket Ground, Sydney, 23 July 1966  3 – Gene Miles at Old Trafford, Manchester, 25 October 1986  3 – Michael O'Connor at Old Trafford, Manchester, 25 October 1986
 Great Britain  3 – Jim Devereux at Park Royal Ground, London, 12 December 1908

Most goals in an Ashes test
 Australia  8 – by Noel Pidding at Sydney Cricket Ground, Sydney, 12 June 1954  8 - by Mal Meninga at Boothferry Park, Hull, 30 October 1982
 Great Britain  10 – by Lewis Jones at Brisbane Cricket Ground, Brisbane, 9 July 1954

Most points in an Ashes test
 Australia  22 (3 tries, 5 goals) by Michael O'Connor at Old Trafford, Manchester, 25 October 1986
 Great Britain  20 (10 goals) by Lewis Jones at Brisbane Cricket Ground, Brisbane, 9 July 1954  20 (2 tries, 6 goals, 1 field goal) - Roger Millward at Sydney Cricket Ground, Sydney, 20 June 1970

Most points in an Ashes series
 Australia  48 (2 tries, 21 goals) by Mal Meninga in 1982
 Great Britain  30 (15 goals) by Lewis Jones in 1954

Most points in all Ashes tests
 Australia  108 (9 tries, 37 goals) by Mal Meninga (17 tests – 1982–1994)
 Great Britain  62 (31 goals) by Jim Sullivan (15 tests – 1924–1933)

Tries in each test of an Ashes series
 Australia  Ken Irvine, 1962 and 1963  Sam Backo, 1988  Mal Meninga, 1990
 Great Britain  George Tyson, 1908–09  Johnny Thomas, 1908–09 and 1910  Jim Leytham, 1910  Jonty Parkin, 1924  Ike Southward, 1958  Garry Schofield, 1986

Most games as captain
 Australia  9 by Clive Churchill (1950–1954)  9 by Wally Lewis (1984–1988)  9 by Mal Meninga (1990–1994)
 Great Britain  10 by Jim Sullivan (1928–1933)

Most games as coach
 Australia – 12 by Frank Stanton (1978–1984)
 Great Britain – 9 by Mal Reilly (1988–1992)

See also

 Australia national rugby league team
 Great Britain national rugby league team
Australia vs England in rugby league

References

Further reading

External links
Ashes battles of the past at BBC Sport

Rugby league international tournaments
Rugby league in Australia
Australia national rugby league team
Great Britain national rugby league team
Rugby league in England
Recurring sporting events established in 1908
Rugby league rivalries
The Ashes
Sports rivalries in Australia
Sports rivalries in the United Kingdom